Sylvaine Duban (born 9 June 1949 in Saint-Étienne, France) is a former French figure skater who competed in ladies singles.  She won the gold medal at the French Figure Skating Championships in 1967 and 1968.  She finished 18th at the 1967 World Figure Skating Championships and 27th at the 1968 Winter Olympics.

Results

References
 Sports-Reference.com profile

1949 births
Olympic figure skaters of France
Figure skaters at the 1968 Winter Olympics
French female single skaters
Living people
Sportspeople from Saint-Étienne